The Rolls-Royce Phantom Coupé is a luxury car manufactured by Rolls-Royce Motor Cars that debuted at the 2008 Geneva International Motor Show in Geneva, Switzerland, on 6 March 2008. The platform is based on the 2003 Rolls-Royce Phantom and has styling heavily derived from the Rolls-Royce 100EX, a concept car unveiled to celebrate the company's centennial in 2004.
Its interior includes leather and wood veneer. There is a button to close the "coach doors" (suicide doors).
It is the first Rolls-Royce coupe in 22 years. It featured pillarless body construction making it a true 2-door hardtop, much like the popular hardtops from the United States in the 1960s.

Specification

The car features reverse-opening power-closing doors, adaptive suspension with automatic four-corner levelling, 21-inch alloy wheels, a 15-speaker 420 watt sound system with navigation, and a handcrafted interior with flawless leather trim and a choice of wood veneers. The "picnic" boot provides a seating platform for two and offers easy access to the luggage compartment. Optional equipment includes front and rear parking cameras and a wide array of paint colours and interior trim material choices. A unique option is a full-length "starlight" headliner, which incorporates hundreds of tiny fibre optics to give the impression of a star-filled night sky.

Performance

Reception
The Phantom Coupé has received mostly positive reviews from critics. The British television show Top Gear rated the car 9/10 for performance, 10/10 for quality, 9/10 for design, but criticised its high cost.

Sweptail
The Rolls-Royce Sweptail was a one-off custom Phantom Coupé sold in 2017 for $12.8 million after a 4-year build  making it the most expensive new car ever sold at the contemporary period.

See also

Coupé

References

External links

 Rolls-Royce official website

Coupé
Cars introduced in 2008
Luxury vehicles
Coupés
2010s cars

de:Rolls-Royce Phantom Drophead Coupé#Rolls-Royce Phantom Coupé
es:Rolls-Royce Phantom Coupé